HMS Phoebe was an  built for the Royal Navy during the First World War. She took part in the Zeebrugge Raid in 1918 and was sold for scrap in 1921.

Description
The Admiralty M class were improved and faster versions of the preceding . They displaced  at normal load. Phoebe was powered by a single Parsons direct-drive steam turbine that drove three propeller shafts using steam provided by three Yarrow boilers. The ships' complement was 76 officers and ratings.

The Admiralty Ms were armed with three single QF  Mark IV guns. One gun was positioned on the forecastle, the second was between the centre and aft funnels and the third at the stern. They were equipped with a pair of QF 2-pounder "pom-pom" anti-aircraft guns, one on each broadside abreast the bridge. They were also fitted with two rotating twin mounts for  torpedoes amidships.

Construction and service
Phoebe was ordered under the Fifth War Programme in February 1915 and built by Fairfield Shipbuilding & Engineering Company at Govan. The ship was launched on 20 November 1916 and completed in December 1916. She escorted H.M.S Vindictive at the Zeebrugge Raid on 23 April 1918. Post-war, the ship was sold for breaking up in November 1921.

Notes

Bibliography

External links
Photo of HMS Phoebe

 

Admiralty M-class destroyers
Ships built in Govan
1916 ships
World War I destroyers of the United Kingdom